Aso (Filipino for dog) is an adventure story arc of the Philippine comic strip series Pugad Baboy, created by Pol Medina Jr. and originally published in the Philippine Daily Inquirer. This particular story arc lasts 88 strips long. In 2003, the story arc was reprinted in Kinse!, the fifteenth book compilation of the comic strip series. Aso is one of the three longest Pugad Baboy story arcs, the other being Maidnappers and Green Heroine.

Synopsis
The story arc begins during a briefing at OCB Headquarters with agents Echo (Eliseo) and Delta (Polgas) and their superior in attendance. The topic of discussion is the prevalence of marijuana plantations in Benguet province. Polgas, however, is assigned a mission to Mount Arayat in Pampanga, where a suspected dope farm is located.

Polgas' initial investigation
Polgas hops unto his Thunderpuppy, a Harley Davidson V-Rod motorcycle, and heads for Mount Arayat. At the town of Bitas, he queries a local regarding climbing the mountain. The local replies that he shouldn't worry about the NPA or Maria Sinukuan, the diwata said to reside on the mountain, but that there was a werewolf lurking there. As Polgas continues promenading around the town, a huramentado (a person who has run amok) attempts to hack him with a bolo knife. Polgas throws the man using an Aikido move. Upon investigating the contents of his disarmed opponent's pockets, Polgas finds what appear to be dried wood of a bluish tint. He sniffs the suspicious cache and his sensitive nose is overwhelmed by what he smells; the unknown substance is actually dried psychedelic mushrooms. Polgas faints from an intense cluster headache. Upon waking up, he discovers that he is in Dr. Dado Galang's clinic. The doctor tells him that aside from the increasing number of cases of people running amok, the number of rabies cases is up as well. All these could be attributed to the reports of a werewolf or impaktong aso roaming the mountain fastness.

Polgas hikes up the mountain
Upon recovering from his headache, Polgas decides to explore Mount Arayat. He first calls the Thunderdog and instructs the computerized Porsche 959 to synthesize an antidote for counteracting the effects of the magic mushrooms. As he went on his way, he became aware of three persons who were following him. Deploying Gary, his fleabot, Polgas intentionally falls into their trap in order to maintain his cover as an innocent hiker. It turns out that the three guys who set the trap were out to catch the werewolf for the bounty. Polgas escapes and climbs a tree to evade the werewolf bounty hunters. Polgas decides that in order to locate the mushroom farm, he had to go towards the south-south east side of the mountain where there was little sunlight and a plentiful source of compost and fertilizer.

The mushroom farm
As Polgas headed toward that part of the mountain, Gary began to note that the punji stick traps along the way were becoming deadlier. All of a sudden, Polgas smelled something familiar; he shines his flashlight on the source of the scent and the malevolent eyes of the werewolf shone back at him. Armed with his ballistic arnis, Polgas runs toward the werewolf, which scampers away. As Polgas took up the chase, a trapdoor suddenly opens up in his path. He collides with the woman who emerged from the tunnel and both tumble down into the cave beneath. Both landed on a stetson-wearing villain. A third goon came down the trapdoor, closing it behind him. All three covered Polgas with their weapons and Carlita, the woman Polgas collided with takes his arnis. 

Hoping to keep his cover, Polgas declares that he had arrived to purchase magic mushrooms. The stetson-wearing goon takes his pack, telling the others to shoot Polgas if the pack didn't contain bundles of bills. Polgas waits for the opportunity to activate the tiny switches on his left glove. The switches activate both the ballistic arnis held by Carlita, which hits the third goon in the head, and the backpack, which sends a spurt of flame towards the other goon's face. The distraction affords Polgas the opportunity to run deeper into the cave, where he discovers the mushroom farm itself. As Polgas barrels through the workers trying to bar his way, the Psilocybin mushrooms' spores scatter and he soon begins to feel the effects of the psycho-active substance. As Polgas begins to hallucinate, he tries to locate an exit in vain. In desperation he asks one of the workers where the exit is. Surprisingly, the worker directs him to the nearest exit. Polgas soon exited the cave, but he wasn't out of danger just yet - at the mouth of the cave were scores of rabid dogs and a suspicious character injecting the dogs with an unknown substance. Upon seeing Polgas, he pressed a button on a portable stereo. Immediately, the rabid dogs went mad and attacked Polgas, who climbed a tree to evade the rabid canines. He recognized the suspicious-looking man, who had climbed the same tree he had - it was the huramentado from the town of Bitas. The goon threw a fistfull of magic mushroom spores at Polgas. Dizzy, Polgas fell from the tree. Before losing consciousness, he felt a bite on his leg. Forcing his eyes open, he saw that it was the werewolf that had bitten him.

The werewolf's true identity
The next morning, Polgas wakes up and discovers that he was at the place where he began to climb the mountain. He thinks that the previous day's events are just a dream, but the painful bite mark on his leg tells him otherwise. The next day, Polgas confronts Dr. Galang at his clinic. He tells him that a canine odor seems to follow the good doctor around, and that he had discovered research material regarding psilocybin mushrooms in the clinic. Dr. Galang's patient profiles also match the behavior of persons who have run amok. Polgas also observed that Dr. Galang does not seem to sweat - just like a canine. To prove his point, Polgas shoots Dr. Galang with his garapata gun. The doctor isn't affected by the garapata sweat, since true canines are immune to its effects. Polgas is quite sure that Dr. Galang is the werewolf. As he is about to arrest the doctor, after giving him a Miranda warning, the doctor jumps out an open window and escapes.

Polgas gives chase. Mounting the Thunderpuppy, he heads for the dark side of Mount Arayat. From high above the forest canopy, the doctor-turned-werewolf seemingly ambushes Polgas, unseating him from the motorcycle. Polgas is still able to land on his feet, but is unable to locate Dado. As his back is turned, he is shot from behind with a double-barreled sawed-off shotgun. His bulletproof suit saves him, but he loses consciousness and upon coming to, he discovers that he had been tied upside down by the ankles and heels. He overhears some of the goons talking about capturing another aside from him, and he sees Dado tied up in the same manner as he is a short distance away. Polgas signals Gary, the flea-bot, which had been waiting in the same place it was deployed since the day before, and it begins to hop towards Polgas.

Dado's story
While both captives waited, they began to talk in low tones. With sharp canine hearing both had no trouble engaging in a conversation, even if they were separated by quite some distance. Dado revealed that his mother had a maternal craving for dog meat while pregnant with him - thus was the reason for his present condition. He sought various cures; to counteract his natural tendency to not sweat, he experimented with psilocybin mushrooms. He experienced undesirable side effects and abandoned the idea. His uncle Henry (the stetson-wearing goon), however, discovered the mushrooms' psychedelic effects and decided that it would be a good substitute for marijuana and he set up a test market in that same area. Dado had ever since been trying to scare buyers away as the himpaktung asu. In order to counter this threat, Henry brought in stray dogs and injected them with the rabies virus. He also set up punji traps around the perimeter of the cave. Polgas then sees his motorcycle impaled upon the punji sticks of a trap; Dado had in fact saved his life when he pounced upon Polgas on his bike earlier.

The tide turns
Henry decides to execute both "werewolves" using silver bullets fired from an air rifle. He attempts to shoot Polgas from point-blank range but Polgas prompts Gary to cut the bonds on his wrists; Polgas grabs the rifle and wallops Henry with it. He then retrieves his ballistic arnis and dispatches a goon aiming a sawed-off shotgun at him. Polgas cuts the rope from which he was hanging and frees Dado. Dado returns the favor by dispatching Carlita/Helga, who was aiming to shoot Polgas with a sawed-off shotgun. Meanwhile, the former huramentado again throws a fistfull of magic mushroom spores at Polgas, thinking to disable him again. However, the effect on Polgas was the reverse; he became noticeably more hirsute and aggressive. Dado explains that when he bit Polgas the previous day, he had effectively transfused his acquired immunity to the effects of psychedelic mushrooms to Polgas. Dado went underground after Helga, while Polgas took on the two remaining goons.

Helga, however, managed to escape by riding a motorcycle with Dado clinging to her back. Meanwhile, Polgas orders the erstwhile huramentado to take down the Thunderpuppy and tie up the subdued goons upsidedown; Polgas leaves him at the tender mercies of the rabid dogs. Hearing Helga's motorcycle, Polgas gives chase on the Thunderpuppy after retrieving Gary, but notes that the gas tank had been pierced by the punji sticks. Gary soon sees that Helga is aiming for a cliff and warns Polgas. Polgas uses his wrist spitter to shoot a line into the trees' branches above and snags Dado off Helga's back. Helga's motorcycle went over the cliff, leaving Dado clutching her torn-off latex full-body disguise and parachute.

Helga's true identity
Polgas recognizes the scent in the disguise and advises Dado that they need to retrieve the villain at the bottom of the cliff. With Dado using Helga's parachute and Polgas using his suit's built-in mini-wings, they went over the cliff after the dope farm's intelligence officer. At the bottom of the cliff, they see what Polgas already knows: Helga is agent Eliseo of the OCB. They bundle him off in a makeshift stretcher. Back at the dope farm, Polgas discovers that Eliseo's boot heels smell like semtex and that his suit also has tiny-tech switches. Dado places the plastic explosive in certain strategic areas of the mushroom farm, after which Polgas detonated the charges using Eliseo's switches. The mushroom farm is destroyed.

As Polgas treats Dado's wounds from Henry's shotgun blast, the doctor confides that even his life span is numbered in dog years; with his accelerated life span he could be dead in a few years. This explains why his uncle Henry didn't recognize him; he appeared more mature to Henry. Polgas suggests that they try transfusing Dado with his blood to counteract this condition; Dado agrees. As they banter, the courier for the mushrooms arrives. It's no other than Renate Domingo, alias Atong Damuho, Polgas' mortal enemy. Polgas arrests him. After Atong Damuho is taken into custody, the doctor takes blood from Polgas and transfuses himself with it. It is not revealed explicitly in the story arc, however, if the procedure is successful; the arc only ended with Dr. Galang convincing Polgas to help him convince the populace that there are no more psychedelic mushrooms threatening the populace as, again, the himpaktung asu. His cameo appearance five books later, in a minor story arc in Pugad Baboy XX, and then again in the story arc Bodyguard in Pugad Baboy 21,  on the other hand, reveals that the process was indeed successful.

Trivia
Agent Echo's wrinkled skin indicates that he is either a Shar pei or a Bloodhound.
The full-body disguise used by the traitorous agent is the likeness of Tiny, Dagul's daughter.
Wolves are not endemic to the Philippines and the Filipino term used to indicate "werewolf", impaktong aso, literally means "supernatural dog". 
The actual phrase used in the arc is "himpaktung asu," a supposed Pampangueño pronunciation stemming from the Pampango stereotype of pronouncing vowel sounds with an "h" and omitting the same sound from those with the letter. This stereotype comes from the fact that the /h/ sound is entirely absent in the Kapampangan language.
This particular story arc is riddled with references to popular culture; Mission: Impossible 2, Tom Cruise, Popeye, Spider-Man, Patrick Duffy, Dallas, Steven Seagal, Elvis Presley, Bruce Lee and Boris Yeltsin are all mentioned.
Polgas refers to the plastic explosive he found on Agent Eliseo as semtex, but Dr. Galang referred to it as C-4, perhaps thinking that both types were one and the same.
When Dado and Polgas become hirsute, they then dance to Hound Dog. Furthermore, their hairstyle resembles that of Wolverine, as played by Hugh Jackman in the live action film X-Men.
Polgas' hirsute state makes reappearances in various strips in the series following the story arc.
When Polgas contacts the Thunderdog, which is back at the Dogcave underneath the Sungcal house, to create the magic mushroom antidote, the Porsche then berates its owner for not bringing it along, as it would've saved Polgas the trouble of his encounter with the huramentado. This is the first time the Thunderdog actually speaks in the series beyond the computer voice (and unexpected high) the Porsche had back in The Baguio Connection, and means it is as sentinent as Gary.
As stated, Dado makes a cameo appearance in a minor arc in Pugad Baboy XX, which parodies the Saw horror films, with Dado as the Jigsaw Killer-like "Pigsaw", terrorizing Utoy, Tiny, Igno, Madame Cabalfin and Polgas in the same way albeit in a rather comical manner. Polgas unmasks Dado, after the latter somewhat gives himself away by saying that like the former, he "was given a second chance at life", implying that the blood transfusion was indeed a success. His next proper appearance is in the story arc Bodyguard, this time as Tomas' partner and the father of the kid that was beaten mercilessly by a General's son.
The arc plays stereotypical Kapampangan traits like: Kampampangan misses or adds h to their words, and their love for dog meat.
Dado later can transform at will during the time of Bodyguard.

Pugad Baboy